Elenberg Fraser is an Australian architecture firm, based in Melbourne with regional hubs in Brisbane and Ho Chi Minh City. It was established in 1998 by Zahava Elenberg and Callum Fraser, both RMIT University graduates. Notable projects include the interior design of restaurants such as Vue du Monde (2005) and Gingerboy (2006) and apartment buildings such as Liberty Tower (2002), Watergate Place (2005), A'Beckett Tower (2010), Eq. Tower (2017), Light House Melbourne (2017), Aurora Melbourne Central (2019),  Swanston Central (2019) and Premier Tower (under construction 2019), all in Melbourne. Their design for the alpine hotels Huski (2005) and St Falls (2009) both at Falls Creek, Victoria received awards for their highly sculptural qualities. In 2009 Elenberg Fraser also completed the adaptive reuse of No 2 Goods Shed in Docklands, a heritage-listed building transformed into office and hospitality space.

Selected projects

Completed

 2002 Liberty Tower, Melbourne
 2005 Vue de Monde, Melbourne
 2005 Watergate Place, Docklands, Melbourne
 2005 Huski Hotel, Falls Creek
 2009 St Falls ski lodge, Falls Creek
 2009 No 2 Goods Shed, Docklands, Melbourne
 2010 A'Beckett Tower, Melbourne
 2013 Luna apartments, St Kilda
 2015 Abode apartments, Russell St, Melbourne
 2016 M Docklands, La Trobe Street, Docklands
 2017 Eq. Tower, A'Beckett Street, Melbourne
 2017 Light House Melbourne, Elizabeth Street, Melbourne
2018 Victoria One, Elizabeth Street, Melbourne
2020 Aurora Melbourne Central, La Trobe Street, Melbourne

Approved or under construction
 2013- 380 Lonsdale Street, Melbourne
 2014- Premier Tower, Spencer St, Melbourne
 2017- Realm Adelaide, Austin Street, Adelaide

Gallery

Awards 
 2011 Asia Pacific Property Awards: Five Star Award High-Rise Architecture: A’Beckett Tower
 2011 Dulux Colour Awards: Winner Grand Prix: Winner Residential Exterior, A’Beckett Tower
 2011 Australian Property Council Innovation & Excellence Awards Best Sustainable Development: Good Shed North
 2011 Australian Interior Design Awards Hospitality: Cafe Vue @ Melbourne International Airport (shortlisted)
 2020 Dulux Colour Awards: Commercial and Multi Residential Exterior (shortlisted), Gem Waterline Place
 2020 Australian Interior Design Awards: Residential Design, Gem Waterline Place

References

External links

Official website

Architecture firms of Australia
Architecture firms based in Victoria (Australia)
1998 establishments in Australia
Design companies established in 1998
Companies based in Melbourne
21st-century Australian architects